Events from the year 1729 in Russia

Incumbents
 Monarch – Peter II

Events

Births

 
 
 Praskovya Bruce - Russian lady-in-waiting and noble, confidant of Catherine the Great (d. 1785)
 November 24 – Alexander Suvorov, Russian general (d. 1800)
 - Ivan Argunov, painter  (d. 1802)

Deaths

 
 
 
  - Prince Alexander Danilovich Menshikov, Russian statesman (born 1673)
 - Maria Menshikova, fiancee of Grand Duke Peter of Russia (born 1711)

References

1729 in Russia
Years of the 18th century in the Russian Empire